Yohanca Delgado (born New York City) is an American writer. She won a 2022 National Endowment for the Arts grant.

She graduated from Kenyon College, and American University. She was an editor at Folio, and Barrelhouse. She is a Stegner Fellow.

Her work appeared in The Paris Review, A Public Space, The Believer, One Story, Time, and Story.

Works 

 The Memory Librarian: And Other Stories of Dirty Computer, Harper Voyager, 2022.

References

External links 
 https://yohanca.com/
 D.C.’s Literary Women Are The Force Behind “Furious Gravity” WAMU, May 14 2020

Living people
Year of birth missing (living people)
Writers from New York City
Kenyon College alumni
American University alumni
21st-century American writers
21st-century American women writers